2608 Seneca, provisional designation , is a stony asteroid and sub-kilometer near-Earth object of the Amor group, approximately 0.9 kilometers in diameter. It was discovered on 17 February 1978, by German astronomer Hans-Emil Schuster at ESO's La Silla Observatory in northern Chile, and named after Roman philosopher Seneca.

Orbit 

Seneca orbits the Sun at a distance of 1.1–4.0 AU once every 3 years and 12 months (1,457 days). Its orbit has an eccentricity of 0.57 and an inclination of 15° with respect to the ecliptic.

The body's observation arc begins with its official discovery observation in 1978, as no precoveries were taken, and no prior identifications were made.

Close approaches 

On 22 March 2062, it will pass  from the Earth.

Physical characteristics 

In the Tholen taxonomy, Seneca is a stony S-type asteroid.

Photometry 

In March 1978, a photometric observations taken by Degewij and Lebofsky at the Lunar and Planetary Laboratory, Arizona, using a 154-cm reflector, gave a rotational lightcurve with a rotation period of 8 hours and a brightness amplitude of 0.4 (0.5) magnitude.

Radiometry 

Diameter and albedo 

The Minor Planet Center classifies Seneca as an object larger than 1 kilometer ("1+ KM Near-Earth Object"), while Collaborative Asteroid Lightcurve Link derives an albedo of 0.20 and a diameter of 0.9 kilometers based on an absolute magnitude of 17.59. In 1994, astronomer Tom Gehrels published a diameter of 0.9 kilometers with an albedo of 0.21 in his Hazards Due to Comets and Asteroids.

Naming 

This minor planet was named after Roman philosopher and statesman Lucius Annaeus Seneca (c. 4 BC – AD 65), also known as "Seneca the Younger" or simply "Seneca". The approved naming citation was published by the Minor Planet Center on 8 April 1982. The lunar crater Seneca was also named in his honor.

References

External links 
 Hazards Due to Comets and Asteroids, Tom Gehrels (1994/5)
 Asteroid Lightcurve Database (LCDB), query form (info )
 Dictionary of Minor Planet Names, Google books
 Asteroids and comets rotation curves, CdR – Observatoire de Genève, Raoul Behrend
 
 
 

002608
Discoveries by Hans-Emil Schuster
Named minor planets
002608
19780217
Seneca the Younger